In organic chemistry, spherical aromaticity is formally used to describe an unusually stable nature of some spherical compounds such as fullerenes, polyhedral boranes.

In 2000, Andreas Hirsch and coworkers in Erlangen, Germany, formulated a rule to determine when a fullerene would be aromatic. They found that if there were 2(n+1)2 π-electrons, then the fullerene would display aromatic properties. This follows from the fact that an aromatic fullerene must have full icosahedral (or other appropriate) symmetry, so the molecular orbitals must be entirely filled. This is possible only if there are exactly 2(n+1)2 electrons, where n is a nonnegative integer. In particular, for example, buckminsterfullerene, with 60 π-electrons, is non-aromatic, since 60/2 = 30, which is not a perfect square.

In 2011, Jordi Poater and Miquel Solà, expanded the rule to determine when an open-shell fullerene species would be aromatic. They found that if there were 2n2+2n+1 π-electrons, then the fullerene would display aromatic properties. This follows from the fact that a spherical species having a same-spin half-filled last energy level with the whole inner levels being fully filled is also aromatic. It is similar to Baird's rule.

See also 
Fullerene chemistry
Carborane
Boranes

References

External links 
 Spherical Aromaticity:  Recent Work on Fullerenes, Polyhedral Boranes, and Related Structures

 
Physical organic chemistry
Supramolecular chemistry